Theba pisana, common names the white garden snail, sand hill snail, white Italian snail, Mediterranean coastal snail, and simply just the Mediterranean snail, is an edible species of medium-sized, air-breathing land snail, a terrestrial pulmonate gastropod mollusk in the family Helicidae, the typical snails.

This species is native to the Mediterranean region, but it has become an invasive species in many other countries. Theba pisana is a well-known agricultural pest in numerous parts of the world. The shell color varies from white to yellow-brown with light brown spiral markings.

Distribution
The species is native to the Mediterranean region. The type locality is Italy.

The distribution of Theba pisana includes the Mediterranean region and adjacent Atlantic coasts from central Morocco to north western Europe:
 Morocco
 Portugal
 In Spain occasionally also in the interior. It is introduced to Menorca. - A subspecies, Theba pisana arietina, from coastal habitats in Spain and Portugal, is on the Red List as Endangered.
 Italy
 Malta
 Greece
 Israel
 Egypt
 Belgium
 central Atlantic islands

The species has been introduced to numerous other areas, including:
 southwestern England and south Wales, Great Britain: - introduced since at least the 1700s
 eastern and southern Ireland - introduced since at least the 1700s and it is still spreading along frost-free coastal localities.
 Netherlands - non-indigenous
 the United States in California
 parts of Africa
 Asia
 southeastern Australia,  southwestern Australia and Tasmania
 South Africa - It was introduced into South Africa prior to 1881. It has invaded the fynbos biome in South Africa. Given the very high densities that Theba pisana can attain at some sites, plus their apparently not particular feeding habits, their potential impact on the vegetation is cause for concern and should be further investigated.

In many of these places T. pisana has become a problematic invasive species and a serious agricultural pest.

This species is already established in the USA, and is considered to represent a potentially serious threat as a pest, an invasive species which could negatively affect agriculture, natural ecosystems, human health or commerce. Therefore it has been suggested that this species be given top national quarantine significance in the USA.

Description

The shell background color is a creamy white. Different individuals may have shells with varying degrees of pale to dark brown markings. The markings, when present, may be in the form of uninterrupted spiral bands, spiral dotted lines, or small radial smudges.

The shell can be found in various colour variants, but is basically yellow or white with dark color bands or spots and often a dark bluish grey apex. The shells of juveniles are sharply keeled, however the keel is not present on the final adult whorl. The aperture often has a lip that is light reddish on the inside, and the lip margin is only reflected at columellar side. The umbilicus is narrow and half covered by the reflected columellar margin. The apex has a characteristic size in the eastern Mediterranean when compared with other species, where there are no other Theba species. The umbilicus is also rarely seen in other species. Juveniles of Eobania vermiculata have a considerably larger apex.

The width of the shell is 12–25 mm, but in Greece the adult shells are usually below 15 mm in width. The height of the shell is 9–20 mm.
The visible soft parts are very light yellowish with dark colour bands running from the sides to the upper tentacles; the tentacles are very long.

This snail is sometimes confused with Cernuella virgata, a species with a much smaller and less inflated shell.

Ecology 

Theba pisana usually lives in coastlands, in or near sandy habitats. In hot climates it aestivates often directly exposed to the sun, attached to grasses, shrubs or succulent plants, fence posts, tall weeds, and so on. It is common near beaches. In dunes it can live on nearly bare sand that is poorly fixed in place by grasses. In colder regions the snails do not aestivate, but they do climb on plants in dry weather. This snail does not survive serious winter frosts.

Theba pisana is often associated with two other land snail species Cochlicella acuta and Cernuella virgata, but it can live slightly deeper inside pure sandy habitats, and is usually more common than Cochlicella acuta. It is one of the most common snails in coastal regions from south Portugal to Greece.

In South Africa, a study showed that these snails were most abundant along roadsides; densities decreased dramatically with distance from roads. The snails were observed to be living on a variety of endemic and introduced plant species; these snails appear to be able to eat an unusually wide range of different food sources. Theba pisana is also a significant pest of citrus, vines, legume crops and cereals in South Africa. In Australia, it feeds on a range of agricultural plants.

Most Theba pisana snails have an annual life cycle, breeding in summer and autumn, but a few also take 2 years to mature. In aestivating T. pisana populations in Israel some individuals retain an immature size and shape and a rudimentary status of the genital system, defined as 'infantiles'; the populations of T. pisana may be self-regulated by the mechanism of infantilism or controlled by humidity or, perhaps, by both. In South Africa, Theba pisana appear to have an annual lifecycle, breeding in autumn to winter and growing to adult size of about 14 mm diameter by the end of the following summer. Maturity is reached at half maximum shell size after 1 year. Maximum shell size is attained after 2 years. This species of snail makes and uses love darts. The size of the egg is 2.2 mm. In South Africa, the population density can reach up to 300-700 snails m².

In South Africa, these snails are active mostly at night and especially during periods of high humidity, irrespective of temperature.

Parasites
Theba pisana is an intermediate host for the terrestrial trematode parasite Brachylaima cribbi.

Impact of invasions 
In addition to the direct negative effect of Theba pisana  feeding on agricultural crops, it also has several other additional effects. 
It uses the stalks of cereals as aestivating sites, which in turn clogs machinery and fouls produce during mechanical harvesting.

According to Quick (1952) Theba pisana has been responsible for the extermination of native snail species as a result of competition for available food.

In their report on the status and potential impacts of alien invasive organisms in the fynbos biome, MacDonald & Jarman (1984) predicted that Theba pisana would have very little impact on ecosystem processes, such as nutrient cycling, energy flow and sediment dynamics or on the germination and succession processes of the plant community itself. However, the snail could seriously impact directly on fynbos plants, by feeding on them, and also displace native herbivores by competing with them for resources, and these effects have not been studied.

References
This article incorporates public domain text from the reference and CC-BY-3.0 text from the reference

Further reading 
 Baker G. H. & Hawke B. G. (1990). "Life History and Population Dynamics of Theba pisana (Mollusca: Helicidae) in a Cereal-Pasture Rotation". Journal of Applied Ecology 27(1): 16-29. JSTOR.
 Baker G. H. & Vogelzang B. K. (1988). "Life-history, population dynamics and polymorphism of Theba pisana (Mollusca: Helicidae) in Australia". Journal of Applied Ecology 25(3): 867-887. JSTOR.
 Cowie R. H. (1985). "Microhabitat choice and high temperature tolerance in the land snail Theba pisana (Mollusca: Gastropoda)". Journal of Zoology 207(2): 201-211. .
 Durr H. J. R. (1946). "A contribution to the morphology and bionomics of Theba pisana (Muller) (Gastropoda: Helicidae)". South African Department of Agriculture. Stellenbosch-Elsenburg Science Series 47: 1-34.
 Gess S. & Gess F. (2007). "Snail Invasion: The potential impact of the invasive Mediterranean snail, Theba pisana on our coastal dune vegetation". Veld and Flora 93: 216-218.
 Hazel W. N. & Johnson M. S. (1990). "Microhabitat choice and polymorphism in the land snail Theba pisana (Müller)". Heredity 65: 449-454. .
 McQuaid C. D., Branch G. M. & Frost P. G. (1979). "Aestivation behaviour and thermal relations of the pulmonate Theba pisana in a semi-arid environment". Journal of Thermal Biology 4(1): 47-56. .

External links 
Animalbase.uni-goettingen.de: Theba pisana — at Animalbase: taxonomy, short description, distribution, biology, status (threats), images. 
 Encyclopedia of Life—EOL.org Theba pisana images
 Pestalert.org: Theba pisana (white garden snail) 
 Ifas.ufl.edu: White garden snail — University of Florida Institute of Food and Agricultural Sciences "Featured Creatures website."
Snailcream.in.th: White garden snail - Images of shell variations in C. hortensis (Thai language translate).

Helicidae
Molluscs of Europe
Agricultural pest molluscs
Gastropods described in 1774
Taxa named by Otto Friedrich Müller
Gastropods of Africa